The 2021 Sacramento State Hornets football team represented California State University, Sacramento in the 2021 NCAA Division I FCS football season. They were led by second-year head coach Troy Taylor and played their home games at Hornet Stadium. They competed as a member of the Big Sky Conference.

Previous season
The Hornets finished the 2019 season 9–4, 7–1 in Big Sky play to finish in a two-way tie for the Big Sky championship with Weber State. They received an at-large bid to the FCS Playoffs where, after a first round bye, they lost to Austin Peay in the second round. The Hornets opted out in the 2020 fall season and 2021 spring season.

Preseason

Big Sky preseason poll
On July 26, 2021, during the virtual Big Sky Kickoff, the Hornets were predicted to finish fifth in the Big Sky by both the coaches and media.

Preseason All–Big Sky team
The Hornets had two players selected to the preseason all-Big Sky team.

Offense

Elijah Dotson – RB

Marshel Martin – TE

Schedule

Roster

Game summaries

at Dixie State

No. 21 Northern Iowa

at California

at Idaho State

Southern Utah

at Montana

Northern Arizona

at Northern Colorado

Cal Poly

Portland State

at No. 10 UC Davis

Ranking movements

References

Sacramento State
Sacramento State Hornets football seasons
Big Sky Conference football champion seasons
2021 NCAA Division I FCS playoff participants
Sacramento State Hornets football